Joachim Ritter (3 April 1903 – 3 August 1974) was a German philosopher and founder of the so-called Ritter School of liberal conservatism.

Biography
Born in Geesthacht, Ritter studied philosophy, theology, German literature, and history in Heidelberg, Marburg, Freiburg and Hamburg. A disciple of Martin Heidegger and Ernst Cassirer, he obtained his doctorate at Hamburg with a dissertation on Nicolas of Cusa in 1925, and was both Cassirer's assistant and a lecturer there. A Marxist in the late 1920s and early 1930s, he became a member of the Nazi Party in 1937 and an officer of the German Wehrmacht in 1940. After World War II, Ritter was appointed professor of philosophy at the University of Münster.

Ritter's philosophical work focuses on a theory of modernity. In a liberal interpretation of G. W. F. Hegel's Philosophy of Right, he developed the view that "bifurcation" is the constitutive structure of the modern world and a necessary precondition for the universal realization of individual freedom. According to Ritter's theory of culture as compensation, arts and humanities have the function of balancing the disenchanted, ahistorical condition of modern society. Alongside Hans-Georg Gadamer, his work on Aristotle's ethics and political theory initiated the renewal of practical philosophy in Germany.

He died in Münster.

Legacy
Ritter is considered one of the most influential philosophers in postwar West Germany. Among his disciples were scholars and public intellectuals like Ernst-Wolfgang Böckenförde, Max Imdahl, Hermann Lübbe, Odo Marquard, and Robert Spaemann. Together with them, Ritter started the „Historisches Wörterbuch der Philosophie“ and contributed to development of conceptual history in the field of philosophy. In the 1980s, Jürgen Habermas opposed the Ritter School for being leading representatives of German neoconservatism. More recent scholarship in intellectual history points out Ritter's seminal role for the modernization of German political thought and the development of a modern liberal republicanism.

See also
 Right Hegelians

Bibliography
Hegel and the French Revolution: Essays on the Philosophy of Right. (Studies in Contemporary German Social Thought), MIT Press 1984.
Metaphysik und Politik. Studien zu Aristoteles und Hegel, Suhrkamp 1969.
Person and property in Hegel's Philosophy of Right (§§34–81), in: Robert B. Pippin and Otfried Höffe (eds.), Hegel on Ethics and politics, Cambridge University Press 2007, p. 101-123. 
Subjektivität. Sechs Aufsätze. Suhrkamp 1974.

References

Further reading
Jan Werner Müller, A Dangerous Mind: Carl Schmitt in Post-War European Thought, Yale University Press 2003.
Jerry Z. Muller, German Neoconservatism ca. 1968–1985. Hermann Lübbe and Others, in: Jan-Werner Müller (ed.), German Ideologies since 1945. Studies in the Political Thought and Culture of the Bonn Republic, New York 2003, p. 161-184.
 Stanley Rosen, Review „Joachim Ritter, Metaphysik und Politik“, in: Contemporary German Philosophy 1 (1982), p. 211-220
 Mark Schweda, Joachim Ritter und die Ritter-Schule zur Einführung, Hamburg: Junius 2015.
 Mark Schweda and Ulrich von Bülow (eds.): Entzweite Moderne. Zur Aktualität Joachim Ritters und seiner Schüler. Göttingen: Wallstein 2017.

Continental philosophers
20th-century German philosophers
Political philosophers
Hermeneutists
Philosophers of art
Philosophers of history
Aristotelian philosophers
Hegelian philosophers